Gavkosh may refer to:
 Gavkosh, Hormozgan
 Gavkosh, Kerman
 Gavkosh, Jiroft, Kerman Province
 Gavkosh, Razavi Khorasan

See also
Gav Kosh (disambiguation)